Step Lightly is an album by American trumpeter Blue Mitchell featuring his first session recorded for the Blue Note label in 1963 but not released until 1980.

Reception

The Allmusic review by Scott Yanow awarded the album 4 stars and stated "music is consistently excellent... Worth searching for".

Track listing
 "Mamacita" (Joe Henderson) - 5:49
 "Sweet and Lovely" (Gus Arnheim, Jules Lemare, Harry Tobias) - 7:45
 "Andrea" (Roger Boykin) - 5:16
 "Step Lightly" (Henderson) - 8:32
 "Cry Me a River" (Arthur Hamilton) - 6:46
 "Bluesville" (Sonny Red) - 4:07

Personnel
Blue Mitchell - trumpet
Leo Wright - alto saxophone
Joe Henderson - tenor saxophone
Herbie Hancock - piano
Gene Taylor - bass
Roy Brooks - drums

References

Blue Note Records albums
Blue Mitchell albums
1980 albums
Albums recorded at Van Gelder Studio
Albums produced by Alfred Lion